Tom Harper (c. 1933 – May 24, 1989) was an American football player and coach.  He served as the head football coach at Wake Forest University in 1972, compiling a record of 2–9.

Head coaching record

References

1930s births
1989 deaths
Clemson Tigers football coaches
Eastern Kentucky Colonels football coaches
Iowa State Cyclones football coaches
Jacksonville Sharks (WFL) coaches
Kentucky Wildcats football players
North Carolina Tar Heels football coaches
Oklahoma State Cowboys football coaches
Virginia Tech Hokies football coaches
Wake Forest Demon Deacons football coaches